The Poor Man's Guardian was a penny weekly newspaper published in London, England by Henry Hetherington from July 1831 to December 1835.

Hetherington published his Poor Man's Guardian, a successor to his earlier (1830–31) penny daily Penny Papers for the People, as an outright challenge to authority. Published at the low price of a penny per weekly copy it bore the explicit heading: Published contrary to 'law' to try the power of 'might' against 'right'.

The paper represented a fight against the consequences of the Six Acts of 1819, imposed by the Tories. The Acts aimed to combat the free, radicalized press seen as representative of a period of radicalism from 1816, which continued until 1820. They imposed a stamped (taxed) press; all publications appearing at less than 26-day intervals had to bear a government stamp and retail at 7d (3p) each. The Poor Man's Guardian was hugely influential upon the decision by the Whig government of Lord Melbourne to lower the tax to a point where newspapers could retail at 4d (1.5p).

The paper claimed that the newspaper stamp was a tax on knowledge; it had the significant motto 'Knowledge is power'. Hetherington's paper was enormously successful and achieved sales of 15,000 copies a week all over the country despite being London-based. Bronterre O'Brien, later a regular contributor to the Northern Star, edited the Poor Man's Guardian from 1832.

References

Further reading

Publications disestablished in 1835
Defunct newspapers published in the United Kingdom
Publications established in 1831
1831 establishments in England
Poverty in England